"A Headache Tomorrow (Or a Heartache Tonight)" is a song written by Chick Rains, and recorded by American country music artist Mickey Gilley.  It was released in January 1981 as the second single from the album That's All That Matters to Me.  The song was Gilley's eleventh number one hit on the country chart.  The single stayed at number one for a single week and spent a total of twelve weeks on the country chart.

Charts

References

1981 singles
Mickey Gilley songs
Song recordings produced by Jim Ed Norman
Epic Records singles
Songs written by Chick Rains
1981 songs